WNHA-LP (107.5 FM, "Alma Radio 107.5") is a radio station licensed to serve the community of New Haven, Connecticut. The station is owned by Alma Radio Inc., and airs a Spanish religious format.

The station was assigned the WNHA-LP call letters by the Federal Communications Commission on November 12, 2014.

References

External links
 Official Website
 FCC Public Inspection File for WNHA-LP
 

NHA-LP
Radio stations established in 2017
2017 establishments in Connecticut
NHA-LP
Mass media in New Haven, Connecticut
NHA-LP